Teucrium albicaule, commonly known as scurfy germander, is a species of flowering plant in the family Lamiaceae, and is endemic to inland areas of Australia. It is a hoary, perennial herb that spreads by root suckers, forming dense stands. The leaves are trifoliate and the white flowers are arranged singly in leaf axils.

Description
Its branches are white or greyish, square in cross-section and densely hairy. The leaves are arranged in opposite pairs, sessile and trifoliate, sometimes appearing to be arranged in whorls of six leaves. Flowering occurs from September to June.

Taxonomy
Teucrium albicaule was first formally described in 1985 by Hellmut R. Toelken in the Journal of the Adelaide Botanic Gardens from specimens collected by William Robert Barker and Robert Chinnock on the Strzelecki Track, near the Queensland-New South Wales border.

Distribution and habitat
Scurfy germander grows in depressions in woodland and shrubland and occurs in arid areas of north-eastern South Australia, south-eastern Northern Territory, north-western Victoria and New South Wales, south and west of Bancannia Lake.

References

albicaule
Lamiales of Australia
Flora of New South Wales
Flora of Victoria (Australia)
Flora of the Northern Territory
Flora of South Australia
Plants described in 1985
Taxa named by Hellmut R. Toelken